Oisín O'Reilly (born 1997) is an Irish hurler who plays for Limerick Senior Championship club Kilmallock. He usually lines out as a full-forward. O'Reilly is a former member of the Limerick senior hurling team.

Playing career

Club

O'Reilly joined the Kilmallock club at a young age and played in all grades at juvenile and underage levels, before joining the club's senior team.

Inter-county

Minor and under-21

O'Reilly first played for Limerick at minor level. On 2 July 2015, he made his first appearance for the team when he came on as a late substitute in Limerick's 1-14 to 0-14 Munster Championship defeat of Cork.

O'Reilly subsequently joined the Limerick under-21 hurling team in 2016 and played during the team's unsuccessful championship campaign. He was included on the panel again the following season and won a Munster Championship medal after a 0-16 to 1-11 defeat of Cork in the final. On 9 September 2017, he came on as a substitute for Barry Murphy in Limerick's 0-17 to 0-11 defeat of Kilkenny in the All-Ireland final.

Under-25

In 2017, O'Reilly joined the Limerick under-25 hurling team. On 18 June 2017, he scored 3-01 from play when Limerick defeated Waterford by 4-12 to 1-19 to win the Munster Championship.

Senior

O'Reilly joined the Limerick senior hurling panel in 2018 and made his first appearance for the team during the pre-season Munster League. He made his first appearance in the National Hurling League on 4 February 2018 in a 1-24 to 0-10 defeat of Offaly at O'Connor Park. On 19 August 2018, O'Reilly was a member of the extended panel when Limerick won their first All-Ireland title in 45 years after a 3-16 to 2-18 defeat of Galway in the final.

O'Reilly was a member of Limerick's extended panel once again during the 2019 National League, however, he made no appearance during Limerick's eight-game run to the title. He was dropped from the panel prior to the start of the Munster Championship.

Career statistics

Honours

Limerick
All-Ireland Senior Hurling Championship (1): 2018
National Hurling League (1): 2019
Munster Senior Hurling League (1): 2018
Munster Under-25 Reserve Hurling Competition (1): 2017
All-Ireland Under-21 Hurling Championship (1): 2017
Munster Under-21 Hurling Championship (1): 2017

References

1997 births
Living people
Kilmallock hurlers
Limerick inter-county hurlers